Pita is a surname and a masculine given name. People with the name include:

Surname
 Afelee F. Pita (born 1958), Tuvaluan diplomat
 Alonso Pita da Veiga (1485–1490), Spanish nobleman and military officer
 Ana Inés Jabares-Pita (born 1987), Spanish stage designer
 Carlos Pita (footballer) (born 1984), Spanish football player
 Carlos Pita (politician) (born 1951), Uruguayan physician, politician and diplomat
 Cristian Pita (born 1995), Ecuadorian cyclist
 Dan Pița (born 1938), Romanian film director
 Dino Pita (born 1988), Swedish basketball player
 Elisala Pita (died 2016), Tuvaluan politician
 Félix Pita Rodríguez (1909–1990), Cuban journalist and poet
 Gabriel Pita da Veiga (1909–1993), Spanish admiral
 Hortensia Blanch Pita (1914–2004), Cuban writer
 Igor Pita (born 1989), Portuguese football player
 Juana Rosa Pita, poet, writer, editor and translator
 Le Tagaloa Pita, Samoan politician
 María Pita (1565–1643), heroine of the defense of A Coruña during the 1589 Siege of Coruña by the English Armada
 Maruxa Pita (born 1930), Spanish missionary and teacher
 Marwin Pita (born 1985), Ecuadorian football player
 Paulo Pita (born 1994), Brazilian football player

Given name
 Pita Ahki (born 1992), New Zealand rugby player
 Pita Alatini (born 1976), Tongan-born New Zealand rugby player
 Pita Bolatoga (born 1984), Fijian football player
 Pita Driti, Fijian soldier
 Pita Elisara (1976–2018), Samoan American football player
 Pita Godinet (born 1987), Samoa rugby player
 Pita Limjaroenrat (born 1980), Thai businessman and politician
 Pita Lus (1935–2021), Papua New Guinean politician
 Pita Maile (born 1990), Tongan rugby player
 Pita Moko (1885–1943), New Zealand land agent
 Pita Nacuva, Fijian politician
 Pita Naruma (born 1959), Fijian rugby player
 Pita Nwana (1881–1968), Nigerian novelist
 Pita Paraone (1945–2019), New Zealand politician
 Pita Rabo (born 1977), Fijian football player
 Pita Sharples (born 1941), New Zealand Māori academic and politician
 Pita Simogun (c. 1900 – 1987), Papua New Guinean politician
 Pita Gus Sowakula (born 1994), Fijian professional rugby player
 Pita Tamindei (c. 1918 – 1968), Papua New Guinean politician
 Pita Taufatofua (born 1983), Tongan athlete
 Pita Taumoepenu (born 1994), American football player

Pseudonym
 Pita, pseudonym of Peter Rehberg (1968–2021), a European electronic musician
 Pita Amor, pseudonym of Guadalupe Teresa Amor Schmidtlein (1918–2000), Mexican poet

Nickname
 Pita (footballer) or Edvaldo Oliveira Chaves (born 1958), Brazilian football player

Masculine given names